Carinascincus coventryi, also known commonly as Coventry's window-eyed skink and the southern forest cool-skink, is a species of lizard in the family Scincidae. The species is endemic to Australia.

Etymology
The specific name, coventryi, is in honor of Australian herpetologist Albert John Coventry.

Geographic range
C. coventryi is found in the Australian states of Victoria and southern New South Wales.

Habitat

Description

Behavior
C. coventryi is terrestrial.

Reproduction
C. coventryi is viviparous.

References

Further reading
Cogger HG (2014). Reptiles and Amphibians of Australia, Seventh Edition. Clayton, Victoria, Australia: CSIRO Publishing. xxx + 1,033 pp. . (Carinascincus coventryi, p. 426).
Rawlinson PA (1975). "Two new lizard species from the genus Leiolopisma (Scincidae: Lygosominae) in southeastern Australia and Tasmania". Memoirs of the National Museum of Victoria 36: 1–15 + Plates 1–2. (Leiolopisma coventryi, new species, pp. 2–4, Figure 1 + Plate 1, figure 1 & Plate 3, figure a).
Wilson S, Swan G (2013). A Complete Guide to Reptiles of Australia, Fourth Edition. Sydney: New Holland Publishers. 522 pp. . (Niveoscincus coventryi).
 

Carinascincus
Skinks of Australia
Endemic fauna of Australia
Reptiles described in 1975
Taxa named by Peter Alan Rawlinson